Silke Hörmann (born 1986) is a German sprint canoer who has competed since the mid-2000s. She has won two silver medals at the ICF Canoe Sprint World Championships (K-2 1000 m: 2010, K-4 1000 m: 2006, 2011).

References

German female canoeists
Living people
1986 births
Canoeists at the 2012 Summer Olympics
Olympic canoeists of Germany
ICF Canoe Sprint World Championships medalists in kayak
Sportspeople from Karlsruhe